Lithuania competed at the 2011 Summer Universiade in Shenzhen, China.

Medalists

Medals by sport

Athletics 

Lithuania was represented by 27 athletes.

Men

Women

Badminton

Kęstutis Navickas

Basketball

Lithuania has qualified both a men's and a women's team.

Cycling

BMX

Mountain

Road

Track

Gymnastics 

Lithuania was represented by 2 gymnasts:

Jevgenij Izmodenov
Vladislav Esaulov

Sailing

Lithuania was represented by 2 sailors.
Juozas Bernotas (RS:X)
Aušra Milevičiūtė (Laser Radial)

Shooting 

Lithuania was represented by 4 shooters.

Swimming

Men

Women

Taekwondo 

Lithuania was represented by one athlete.

Weightlifting

Lithuania was represented by 8 athletes.

References

Lithuanian team report

2011 in Lithuanian sport
Nations at the 2011 Summer Universiade
Lithuania at the Summer Universiade